Unknown Territory is a studio album by the American surf guitarist Dick Dale, released in 1994. Dale supported the album with a North American tour. The cover of "Ring of Fire" was a tribute to Dale's childhood love of country music.

Critical reception

The Chicago Tribune wrote that "the extravagance of [Dale's] embroiderings suggesting jazz even as the savagery of his attack is rock incarnate." The Los Angeles Times opined that "the album's prime stuff is defined less by speed than by its sexy swagger ... 'F Groove' offers slow, heavy rock that is truly low-down and mean." The News Tribune determined that "Hava Nagila" "sounds like the Ramones picked up a B'nai Brith songbook."

Track listing 
All tracks composed by Dick Dale, except where indicated.
"Scalped" – 4:05
"Mexico" (Boudleaux Bryant) – 3:05
"F Groove" – 4:26
"Terra Dicktyl" – 3:11
"Take It or Leave It" – 4:27
"Ghost Riders in the Sky" (Stan Jones) – 3:16
"Fish Taco" – 2:39
"California Sun" (Henry Glover) – 3:16
"Maria Elena" – 4:19
"Hava Nagila" (traditional) – 4:00
"The Beast" – 3:09
"Unknown Territory" – 7:55
"Ring of Fire" (Merle Kilgore, June Carter) – 3:31

Personnel 
 Dick Dale – guitar, vocals
 Ron Eglit – bass guitar, 6 string bass
 Scott Mathews – drums, percussion
 Prairie Prince – drums, percussion
 Tribe Vibe (Scott Mathews, Dick Dale, Prairie Prince, Morgan Raimond, Joe Marquez) – chants
 Huey Lewis – harmonica on "Ghost Riders in the Sky" and "F Groove"

References

1994 albums
Dick Dale albums
HighTone Records albums